Saikhom is a Meitei surname. Notable people with the surname include:

 Kamala Saikhom, Indian actress
 Saikhom Mirabai Chanu (born 1994), Indian weightlifter
 Thomas Saikhom (born 1982), Indian footballer

Indian surnames